E 016 is a European B class road in Kazakhstan, connecting the cities Zapadnoe - Nur-Sultan.

Route 

Zapadnoe
Nur-Sultan

External links 
 UN Economic Commission for Europe: Overall Map of E-road Network (2007)

International E-road network
European routes in Kazakhstan